Nigel Burgess may refer to:

Nigel Burgess (footballer) (1981–), Bermudian international footballer who also played rugby union for Bermuda.
Nigel Burgess (yachtsman) (1942–1992), British yachtsman